Thomas or Tom Higgins may refer to:
Thomas Higgins (Irish politician) (1865–1906), MP
Thomas J. Higgins (1831–1917), American Civil War soldier, recipient of the Medal of Honor
Thomas Higgins (RAF officer) (1880–1953), British soldier and airman
Thomas Aquinas Higgins (1932–2018), American federal judge
Tom Higgins (rock climber) (1944–2018), American rock climber and author
Tom Higgins (Canadian football) (born 1954), American-born Canadian and American football player and coach
Thomas Michael Higgins (born 1966), American banker and social entrepreneur
Tom Higgins (footballer, born 1874) (1874–1916), English footballer
Thomas Twistington Higgins, head surgeon at Great Ormond Street Hospital

See also
Tom O'Higgins (1916–2003), Irish politician and judge
Thomas F. O'Higgins (1890–1953), Irish politician